2061 – An exceptional year  is a 2007 Italian comedy film directed by Carlo Vanzina.

Plot
Italy, year 2061: After a terrible energy crisis due to the depletion of oil stocks, the Earth is plunged into a kind of new Middle Ages. Italy as a nation no longer exists, the peninsula has returned to being a divided country, almost pre-Risorgimento, where now reigns the political situation is similar to that before the reunification of 1861:
 The secessionist Lega Nord have conquered Milan, creating the Lombard Republic with Turin as its capital, defended by a high wall erected on the Po River to block the entrance to the "southerners";
 In Emilia-Romagna has been proclaimed "People's Republic of Sickle and Mortadella", which is famous for mortadella, rubles and dance halls;
 Tuscany is back to being a Grand Duchy, where the houses Della Valle and Cecchi Gori are struggling for power;
 In Rome, the Papal State is reborn, a fundamentalist regime dominated by the Inquisition;
 The South has been invaded instead by North Africans, who have created the rich "Sultanate of the Two Sicilies", an Islamic state where Arabic is the official language.

Just from the South, a group of adventurous patriots of the insurrectional movement "Young Italy", made up of volunteers Tony, Pride, Grosso, Salvim and Taned, and led by Ademaro Maroncelli (teacher at the Classical Lyceum Massimo D'Alema of Turin) undertakes a difficult journey to the Piedmont, in order, two hundred years later, to reunify Italy.

Cast

Diego Abatantuono: Professor Ademaro Maroncelli
Emilio Solfrizzi: Nicola Cippone
Sabrina Impacciatore: Mara Pronesti
Dino Abbrescia: Tony
Stefano Chiodaroli: Grosso
Jonathan Kashanian: Pride
: Salvim
: Taned
Andrea Osvárt: Unna
Michele Placido: Cardinal Bonifacio Colonna
: Nunzia La Moratta	
Massimo Ceccherini: Cosimetto Delli Cecchi
: Marchese di Villa Sparina
Ugo Conti: Shrek
Enzo Salvi: Becchino

References

External links 
 

Peak oil films
Fiction set in 2061
Films directed by Carlo Vanzina
Films set in the 2060s
Italian post-apocalyptic films
Inquisition in fiction
Politics in fiction
Films about invasions
Islam in fiction
Fictional future countries
Italian science fiction comedy films
2000s science fiction comedy films
2000s Italian-language films
2007 films